The 1910–11 Scottish Cup was the 38th staging of Scotland's most prestigious football knockout competition. The Cup was won by Celtic who defeated Hamilton Academical 2–0 in the replayed final, after drawing 0–0.

Calendar

First round

Replays

Second round

Replays

Quarter-finals

Semi-finals

Final

Replay

Teams

See also
1910–11 in Scottish football

References

External links
RSSSF: Scottish Cup 1910–11
Soccerbase: Scottish Cup 1910–11

1910-11
1910–11 domestic association football cups
Cup